HMS Clyde (pennant number P257) was an offshore patrol vessel and was the tenth Royal Navy vessel to carry the name. Clyde was decommissioned on the 20 December 2019 at HMNB Portsmouth and was returned to her owners at BAE Systems Maritime - Naval Ships,  
 although the ship remained under lease from BAE Systems to the Royal Navy until the end of March 2020. In August 2020 Clyde was transferred to the Kingdom of Bahrain.

Operational history

She was named in a ceremony on 7 September 2006 as she had not received a traditional launching ceremony.

HMS Clyde was commissioned into the Royal Navy in a ceremony at Portsmouth Naval base on 30 January 2007.

After being commissioned into active service Clyde was sent to the South Atlantic to relieve  as the Royal Navy's patrol vessel in the area based in the Falkland Islands. Unlike predecessors in this role Clyde stayed in South Atlantic waters, with a contract in place for her to remain in the Falkland Islands until 2018.

In January 2011, the government of Brazil denied HMS Clyde access to Rio de Janeiro in solidarity with Argentinian claims over the Falkland Islands sovereignty dispute, as Uruguay had done with  the previous September.

On 18 November 2015, Clyde assisted in the rescue of 347 passengers and crew from the cruise ship Le Boreal drifting off the Falkland Islands after an engine room fire. At , it took Clyde four hours to reach the stricken ship, which was off the north end of Falkland Sound. Clyde resupplied one of the two larger lifeboats with fuel and took on people from the smaller lifeboats, and then escorted them to Falkland Sound, where they transferred the passengers to Le Boreals sister ship, .

In January 2017, Clyde was dry docked in Simonstown, South Africa for maintenance; her patrol duties were temporarily transferred to survey ship . On 21 September, Clyde celebrated ten years in the South Atlantic with her only time off station being the maintenance periods in South Africa. In November, Clyde was redeployed from a patrol of South Georgia to assist in the search for the missing Argentinian submarine .

End of Royal Navy service
A parliamentary briefing paper released in October 2016 stated that Clyde would leave service in 2017; however on 24 April 2017, in a written answer to a question raised by Sir Nicholas Soames, Parliamentary Under-Secretary for Defence Harriett Baldwin stated Clyde would be decommissioned in 2019. Clyde was due to be replaced by the Batch 2 ship  in 2018. However, later than originally planned, Forth relieved Clyde in late 2019. Clyde returned to Portsmouth after an absence 12 years on 20 December 2019 and was decommissioned on the same day.

Clyde was rumoured to be taken over by Brazil once the Royal Navy lease expired. However, this was denied by the Brazilian Navy, with BAE Systems taking back possession of the ship at the end of the Royal Navy's lease.

Transfer to Bahrain

On 7 August 2020 it was announced in a ceremony held at the HMNB Portsmouth Naval Base in the UK, that Clyde had been transferred to the Royal Bahrain Naval Force, with the ship renamed as RBNS Al-Zubara. The ceremony was held in the presence of the Bahraini Ambassador to the UK and representatives of BAE Systems.

See also
Standing Royal Navy deployments

References

External links

Ships built in Portsmouth
River-class patrol vessels
2006 ships
Ships of the Fishery Protection Squadron of the United Kingdom